Henry Holbeach ( – 2 August 1551) was an English clergyman who served as the last Prior and first Dean of Worcester, a suffragan bishop, and diocesan bishop of two Church of England dioceses.

Life
Born as Henry Rands (or Randes) in Holbeach, Lincolnshire, he assumed the name of his birthplace on becoming a monk at Crowland Abbey. He proceeded to Cambridge (Bachelor of Theology {BTh} 1527, Doctor of Theology {DTh} 1534), and became prior of Buckingham College, Cambridge.

In 1536, he was elected the Prior of Worcester, and two years later he also became the Bishop of Bristol, a suffragan bishop in the Diocese of Worcester. Following the Dissolution of the Monasteries in 1540, the priory was re-established as a cathedral with Holbeach becoming the first Dean of Worcester in 1542. In 1544, he became Bishop of Rochester, and finally in 1547 Bishop of Lincoln.

Marriage
He is believed to have been the first of the English (post reformation) bishops to have been married, his wife Joan proving his will on 5 October 1551 and he left a son Thomas Randes. According to his descendant, Cater Rand, he was "one of the compilers of the liturgy". Holbeach developed the sweating sickness and died on 2 August 1551 at Nettleham (some accounts give 6 August as date of death) and was buried there on 7 August 1551.

References

1551 deaths
People from Holbeach
Bishops of Lincoln
Bishops suffragan of Bristol
Bishops of Rochester
16th-century English bishops
English Christian monks
Anglican monks
Deans of Worcester
People associated with the Dissolution of the Monasteries
Year of birth uncertain
Deaths from sweating sickness
Alumni of the University of Cambridge
Priors of Worcester
1477 births
1470s births